Heaphy may refer to:

Bill Heaphy (1888-1914), Australian rules footballer
Charles Heaphy (1821–1881), New Zealand explorer, son of Thomas Heaphy 
Chris Heaphy, New Zealand artist
Shawn Heaphy (born 1968), Canadian ice hockey player
Tim Heaphy (born 1964), American attorney and law professor
Thomas Heaphy (1775–1835), English water-colour painter
Thomas Frank Heaphy (1813 - 1873), English painter of miniatures, son of Thomas Heaphy